Marilyn Stebner Kite (born October 22, 1947) is a former justice of the Wyoming Supreme Court, serving on the high court from 2000 to 2015. She was elected chief justice by her fellow justices in 2010 and served one term.

She is a native of Laramie, Wyoming and attended law school there at the University of Wyoming. Kite was the first woman named to the position of chief justice in Wyoming.

See also
List of female state supreme court justices

References

1947 births
Living people
Politicians from Laramie, Wyoming
University of Wyoming College of Law alumni
Justices of the Wyoming Supreme Court
Women chief justices of state supreme courts in the United States
Chief Justices of the Wyoming Supreme Court
20th-century American women judges
20th-century American judges
21st-century American women judges
21st-century American judges